Peypin is a commune in the Bouches-du-Rhône department in the Provence-Alpes-Côte d'Azur region of France.

Population

Its inhabitants are called Peypinois in French. In 1870 the commune of La Destrousse was formed from part of Peypin.

See also
Communes of the Bouches-du-Rhône department

References

External links
  Official commune website

Communes of Bouches-du-Rhône
Bouches-du-Rhône communes articles needing translation from French Wikipedia